Locomotion, previously known as Locomotion the National Railway Museum at Shildon, is a railway museum in Shildon, County Durham, England. The museum was renamed in 2017 when it became part of the Science Museum Group.

Overview
The museum was opened on 22 October 2004 by Prime Minister and local MP Tony Blair. Built at a cost of £11.3 million, it is based on the former "Timothy Hackworth Victorian Railway Museum". The museum is operated in partnership with Durham County Council and was expected to bring 60,000 visitors a year to the small town. However, during its first six months, the museum attracted 94,000 visits.  Locomotion was shortlisted as one of the final five contenders in the Gulbenkian Prize, which is the largest arts prize in the United Kingdom.

As part of the 2025 plans for the National Railway Museum, a second building will be built to house more of the wider collection. In addition, parts of the original museum including the coal drops will be restored having fallen out of use.

Site
The museum is sited near Timothy Hackworth's Soho Works on the world's first public railway, the Stockton and Darlington Railway (opened on 27 September 1825 with a train hauled by Locomotion No 1 which took 2 hours to complete the  journey from Shildon to Darlington). The town was to become a major centre for British railway engineering thanks to the Shildon wagon works, which closed in 1984.

Shildon station, on the Tees Valley Line was rebuilt and modernised as part of the museum's construction and is actually situated adjacent to the trail and demonstration rail line through the museum site. It is served by all services on the line, operated by Northern.

Museum landmarks
The museum is arranged as stops along the  demonstration line with station direction board signs and information points on the trail between the car parks and the main collection building. The museum has a six-spur apron in front of the main shed and another short length of track for showing off resident locomotives and visiting trains.

The trail starts at the 19th-century welcome building. The original Sans Pareil was previously on display here (It has since been moved to the Collection Building).
The second building is Timothy Hackworth's house. It contains several activities about the history of Shildon. Soho is a stone building that was a railway workshop, having originally been an iron merchant's store. The fourth stop is the former goods shed for the town, with most incoming and outgoing goods being delivered to the railway by horse and cart. The building is built partially from recycled stone sleeper blocks, the old fixing slots being visible in the wall.

The railway station's parcel office is the next part of the trail and at the junction, visible across the tracks are the former stables for the early horse-drawn wagonways that linked to the line. The coal drops were a refuelling point for steam locomotives. Wagons were hauled up an incline and the coal 'dropped' down wooden chutes into the tender below.

The trail passes under the roadway. There is a children's playground and a picnic area outside the Collection building. The trail ends at the largest building in the museum. It contains the exhibition hall and a conservation workshop with viewing gallery to see the work carried out by volunteers restoring some of the exhibits. Other facilities in the building include interactive games, a cafe and shop.

Exhibits
The museum is home to several locomotives from the National Collection, including a replica of Timothy Hackworth's Sans Pareil. The original engine, built to compete in the Rainhill Trials, is also at Shildon. The trials were to decide which engine should operate the passenger railway between Liverpool and Manchester. After a 175 years absence from the town, the locomotive was returned and is displayed in the Collection building. LNER Class A4 4468 Mallard which is usually displayed in the NRM's York museum was temporarily displayed in the museum from June 2010 to July 2011. In 2014, ahead of the 75th-anniversary celebrations for Mallard's setting the world steam speed record, 8,000 visitors turned up to welcome five sister A4 locomotives including 60008 "Dwight D Eisenhower" and 60010 "Dominion of Canada" that were repatriated from North America, the latter was given a cosmetic overhaul in Shildon's workshop.

The main exhibition building houses most of the collection and includes the sole examples of the prototype APT-E and Deltic units. The museum has a wind turbine which provides power to the National Grid and an on-site biodiesel bus for transporting visitors around the site.

The NRM recommends checking with them in advance if going to see a particular exhibit.

See also

List of British railway museums
List of transport museums
B&O Railroad Museum (US)
Exporail (Canada)
Nuremberg Transport Museum (Germany)
Workshops Rail Museum (Australia)

Notes

References

External links

 Museum website
 The official National Railway Museum print website containing many vintage posters and prints from the museum's collections

2004 establishments in England
Museums established in 2004
Heritage railways in County Durham
Museums in County Durham
Museums sponsored by the Department for Digital, Culture, Media and Sport
Railway museums in England
Science Museum Group
Shildon